Parineeta may refer to:
Parineeta (novel), a 1914 Bengali-language novel by Sarat Chandra Chattopadhyay
Parineeta (1942 film), directed by Pashupati Chatterjee, based on the novel
Parineeta (1953 film), directed by Bimal Roy, based on the novel
Parineeta (1969 film), directed by Ajoy Kar, based on the novel
Parineeta (1986 film), directed by Alamgir Kabir, Bangladeshi film
Parineeta (2005 film), directed by Pradeep Sarkar, based on the novel
Parineeta (2019 film), an Indian Bengali romantic drama film
Parineeta Borthakur (born 1985), Indian actress